Colin Bourke (born 15 October 1984) is a Japanese rugby sevens player. He competed in the men's tournament at the 2020 Summer Olympics. Born in New Zealand, Bourke moved to Japan in 2012 to play with the Richo Black Rams and he was naturalized as a citizen in 2018.

In his career, Bourke played for:

 Napier Boys High School.
 Taradale.
 Mt Maunganui.
 New Zealand Schools 2002. Played verses Fiji and Australian schools.
 New Zealand Maori - 2010 (3 games). Played against NZ Barbarians, Ireland and England.
 UK Barbarians - 2010.

References

External links
 

1984 births
Living people
Male rugby sevens players
Olympic rugby sevens players of Japan
Rugby sevens players at the 2020 Summer Olympics
Place of birth missing (living people)
Naturalized citizens of Japan
Japanese people of New Zealand descent
Japanese rugby union players
New Zealand rugby union players
Bay of Plenty rugby union players
Highlanders (rugby union) players
L'Aquila Rugby players
Chiefs (rugby union) players
Black Rams Tokyo players
Rugby union flankers
NTT DoCoMo Red Hurricanes Osaka players